= Thegotics =

Field of morphological study

Thegotics is the field of study concerned with the morphological, functional, evolutionary and behavioural elements of thegosis and the treatment of its related physical, emotional, and social pathology.

== History ==
In 1958, at a dental conference in Christchurch, New Zealand, Dr. R.G. Every, made the claim that human tooth grinding was actually tooth sharpening, The biological relevance of this behaviour and its clinical significance, was published in The Lancet.

Homer first documented the phenomena of a particular tooth-sharpening behaviour in the Iliad. The Greek word to describe this behaviour is thego meaning: to whet and sharpen, and metaphorically, to excite and provoke.

Many animals, both vertebrates and invertebrates, have evolved this behaviour. It provides the same biological advantage: shaping and sharpening teeth and tooth-like structures as tools. In some instances, as efficient weapons.

== Critical review ==
There has been general acceptance of the phenomenon in some scientific disciplines but in the medical science disciplines, there has been criticism of the biological role of the phenomenon in humans.
